Monotrema may refer to:
 Monotremes
 Monotrema (plant), a genus of plants in the family Rapateaceae

Taxonomy disambiguation pages